Johnny Howard (born 2 October 1980) is a retired English rugby union player, most often playing as scrum-half.

Career
Howard first played rugby aged seven at Aylesbury Rugby Club. In 1998, he joined Northampton Saints Rugby Academy, and in the next ten years appeared for the club as a scrum-half and occasionally on the wing. In 2008, he moved to France and played for Aviron Bayonnais. In 2009, he moved again to Pays d'Aix RC and, in 2010, to AS Béziers Hérault, for whom he played until his retirement from professional rugby in 2013. He was in the squad that won promotion to Pro D2 in 2010.

Post-rugby
After retiring from professional sport, Howard opened a restaurant (La Charnière) in Béziers with another player, Charly Malié. The restaurant displays items and memorabilia associated with rugby union, including Andrew Mehrtens' boots. He plays amateur rugby union for Valras.

References

1980 births
Living people
Rugby union scrum-halves
Northampton Saints players
English rugby union players
Rugby union players from Buckinghamshire
Expatriate rugby union players in France
Aviron Bayonnais players
Provence Rugby players
AS Béziers Hérault players
English expatriate rugby union players
English expatriate sportspeople in France